Onnamide A is a bioactive natural product found in Theonella swinhoei, a species of marine sponge whose genus is well known for yielding a diverse set of biologically active natural products, including the swinholides and polytheonamides. It bears structural similarities to the pederins, a family of compounds known to inhibit protein synthesis in eukaryotic cells. Onnamide A and its analogues have attracted academic interest due to their cytotoxicity and potential for combating the growth and proliferation of cancer cells.

History
Onnamide A was first isolated in 1988 from Theonella spp., a genus of marine sponges residing off the coast of Okinawa, Japan, as part of a bioassay aimed at discovering novel marine natural products possessing antiviral activity. Eight analogues possessing similar structure, as well as cytotoxicity were reported in 1992.

Structure
Onnamide A is a complex biomolecule with a 39 unique carbon atoms and 11 degrees of unsaturation. Its core contains three rings, two of which comprise a dimeric lactone structure. It contains a long side chain that has a three conjugated trans- olefins that connects to an amide bond, terminating in an arginine residue. The stereochemical assignments of onnamide A have been extensively characterized by experimental and advanced NMR studies.

Biosynthesis

Genomic studies suggest strong homology with Ped genes, which encode the production of pederins, structurally similar compounds synthesized by bacterial endosymbionts of Paederus beetles. This suggests that onnamide A is actually the product of bacterial endosymbionts of the marine sponges from which the compound was first isolated. Thus, the biosynthetic pathway of onnamide A is envisioned to undertake analogous steps as those that lead to pederin, utilizing a prokaryotic PKS-NRPS system.

Cytotoxicity 

Onnamide A inhibits protein synthesis in cell lines, leading to induction of stress-activated protein kinases apoptosis in the affected cell. Its derivatives have been found to be highly toxic towards leukemic cells of the P388 cell line.

See also
Pederin

References

Polyketides
Polyenes
Guanidines
Secondary alcohols
Carboxamides
Ethers
Carboxylic acids
Acetals
Ketals
Enones